Sir Thomas Beaumont, 1st Baronet (died 11 August 1676) was an English politician.

Biography
Beaumont was the oldest son of Sir Henry Beaumont and Elizabeth, daughter of Sir William Turpin. Beaumont sat as a member of parliament (MP) for Leicestershire between 1654 and 1659 and was High Sheriff of Leicestershire between 1668 and 1669. On 5 March 1658, he was created a baronet, of Stoughton Grange, in the County of Leicester by the Lord Protector Oliver Cromwell. After the Restoration however this creation was declared invalid and Beaumont received a new patent, dated on 21 February 1661.

Family
Beaumont married Elizabeth Trott, daughter of Sir Nicholas Trott. They had three sons and three daughters. Beaumont was buried at Stoughton, Leicestershire and was succeeded in the baronetcy by his eldest son Henry.

Notes

References

Further reading

1676 deaths
Baronets in the Baronetage of England
High Sheriffs of Leicestershire
Year of birth missing
People from Stoughton, Leicestershire
Members of the Parliament of England for Leicestershire
English MPs 1654–1655
English MPs 1656–1658
English MPs 1659